Maraire is a surname. Notable people with the surname include:

Chiwoniso Maraire (1976–2013), Zimbabwean singer-songwriter and musician
Dumisani Maraire (1944–1999), Zimbabwean musician
J. Nozipo Maraire (born 1964), Zimbabwean doctor and writer

Bantu-language surnames